A night-vision device (NVD), also known as a night optical/observation device (NOD), night-vision goggle (NVG), is an optoelectronic device that allows visualization of images in low levels of light, improving the user's night vision. The device enhances ambient visible light and converts near-infrared light into visible light which can be seen by the user; this is known as I2 (image intensification). By comparison, viewing of infrared thermal radiation is referred to as thermal imaging and operates in a different section of the infrared spectrum. A night vision device usually consists of an image intensifier tube, a protective housing, and may have some type of mounting system. Many NVDs also include a protective sacrificial lens, mounted over the front lens (ie. objective lens) on NVDs to protect the latter from damage by environmental hazards and some can incorporate telescopic lenses. The image produced by an NVD is typically monochrome green, as green was considered to be the easiest color to look at for prolonged periods in the dark. Night vision devices may be passive, relying solely on ambient light, or may be active, using an IR (infrared) illuminator to better visualize the environment. 

Night vision devices can be handheld but many are head-mounted and attach to helmets. When used with firearms, an IR laser sight is often mounted to the user's weapon. The laser sight produces an infrared beam that is only visible through an NVD and aids with aiming. Some night vision devices are specially made to be mounted to firearms. These can used in conjunction with weapon sights like rifle scopes or can be used as standalone sights; some thermal weapon sights have been designed to provide similar capabilities.

These devices were first used in World War II and came into wide use during the Vietnam War. The technology has evolved greatly since its introduction, leading to several "generations" of night-vision equipment with performance increases and price reductions. Consequently, though they are commonly used by the military and law enforcement agencies, night vision devices are available to civilian users for a wide range of applications including aviation, driving, demining, etc.

History

Early night vision technology used prior to the end of World War II has been described as Generation 0.

In 1929 Hungarian physicist Kálmán Tihanyi invented an infrared-sensitive electronic television camera for anti-aircraft defense in the UK.

Night-vision devices were introduced in the German Army as early as 1939 and were used in World War II. AEG started developing the first devices in 1935. In mid-1943, the German Army began the first tests with infrared night-vision devices and telescopic rangefinders mounted on Panther tanks. Two different arrangements were constructed and used on Panther tanks. The Sperber FG 1250 ("Sparrow Hawk"), with a range of up to 600 m, had a 30 cm infrared searchlight and an image converter operated by the tank commander.

An experimental Soviet device called the PAU-2 was field-tested in 1942.

From late 1944 to March 1945 the German military conducted successful tests of FG 1250 sets mounted on Panther Ausf. G tanks (and other variants). Before World War II ended in 1945, approximately 50 (or 63) Panthers had been equipped with the FG 1250 and saw combat on both the Eastern and Western Fronts. The "Vampir" man-portable system for infantry was used with StG 44 assault rifles.

Parallel development of night-vision systems occurred in the US. The M1 and M3 infrared night-sighting devices, also known as the "sniperscope" or "snooperscope", saw limited service with the US Army in World War II and in the Korean War, to assist snipers. These were active devices, using a large infrared light source to illuminate targets. Their image-intensifier tubes used an anode and an S-1 photocathode, made primarily of silver, cesium, and oxygen, and electrostatic inversion with electron acceleration was used to achieve gain.

Examples
 PAU-2
 PNV-57A tanker goggles
 SU-49/PAS-5
 T-120 Sniperscope, 1st model (World War II)
 M2 Sniperscope, 2nd model (World War II)
 M3 Sniperscope, 4th model (Korean War)
 AN/PAS-4 (early Vietnam War)

After World War II, Vladimir K. Zworykin developed the first practical commercial night-vision device at Radio Corporation of America, intended for civilian use. Zworykin's idea came from a former radio-guided missile.  At that time, infrared was commonly called black light, a term later restricted to ultraviolet. Zworykin's invention was not a success due to its size and cost.

United States

Generation 1 

First-generation passive devices developed and patented by the US Army in the 1960s, introduced during the Vietnam War, were an adaptation of earlier active GEN 0 technology and relied on ambient light instead of using an extra infrared light source.

Examples:
 AN/PVS-1 Starlight scope
 AN/PVS-2 Starlight scope
 AN/PAS 6 Varo Metascope

Generation 2 (GEN II) 

Second-generation devices developed in the 1970s, featuring an improved image-intensifier tube using a micro-channel plate (MCP) with an S-25 photocathode, and resulted in a much brighter image, especially around the edges of the lens. This led to increased clarity in low ambient-light environments, such as moonless nights. Image resolution and reliability were also improved.

Examples:
 AN/PVS-3 Miniaturized night vision sight
 AN/PVS-4
 AN/PVS-5
 SUPERGEN

Later advances in GEN II technology brought the tactical characteristics of "GEN II+" devices (equipped with better optics, SUPERGEN tubes, improved resolution and better signal-to-noise ratios), though GEN II+ is not formally recognized by the NVESD.

Generation 3 (GEN III) 

Third-generation night-vision systems, developed in the late 1980s, maintained the MCP from Gen II, but used a photocathode made with gallium arsenide, which further improved image resolution. Gallium arsenide photocathodes are primarily manufactured by L3Harris Technologies and Elbit Systems of America and image light from 500-900 nm. In addition, the MCP is coated with an ion barrier film to increase tube life. However, the ion barrier causes fewer electrons to pass through, thus diminishing the improvement that the gallium-arsenide photocathode provides. Because of the ion barrier, the "halo" effect around bright spots or light sources is larger as well. Light amplification with these devices is improved to around –. Power consumption is higher than in GEN II tubes.

Examples:
 AN/PVS-7
 AN/NVS-7
 AN/PVS-10
 AN/PVS-14
 AN/PNVS-14
 AN/PVS-17
 CNVS-4949
 PN-21K

Auto-gating 
Autogating (ATG) is a function which rapidly switches the power supply's voltage to the photocathode on and off. However, these switches are rapid enough that they are not detectable to the human eye and peak voltage supplied to the night vision device is maintained. This achieves several purposes: first, it reduces the "duty cycle" (ie. the amount of time that the tube has power running through it) which increases the device's lifespan. Second, autogating enhances the BSP (Bright-Source Protection), which is the built-in system that reduces the voltage supplied to the photocathode in response to ambient light levels. ABC (Automatic Brightness Control) is a similar function which modulates the amount of voltage supplied to the microchannel plate (rather than the photocathode) in response to ambient light. Together, BSP and ABC (alongside the autogating function) serve to prevent temporary blindness for the user and prevent damage to the tube when the night vision device is exposed to sudden bright sources of light, like a muzzle flash or artificial lighting being switched on. These modulation systems also help maintain a steady illumination level in the user's view which improves the ability to keep "eyes on target" in spite of temporary flashes of light. These functions are especially useful for pilots, soldiers in urban environments, and special operations forces who may be exposed to dynamic, rapidly changing light levels.

Generation 3+ (GEN III OMNI I–IX) 

OMNI, or OMNIBUS, refers to a series of contracts through which the US Army purchased GEN III night vision devices. This started with OMNI I which procured AN/PVS-7A and AN/PVS-7B devices, then continued with OMNI II (1990), OMNI III (1992), OMNI IV (1996), OMNI V (1998), OMNI VI (2002), OMNI VII (2005), OMNI VIII, and OMNI IX. 

However, OMNI is not a specification in and of itself. The performance of a particular GEN III OMNI device generally depends upon the tube which is used. For example, a GEN III OMNI III MX-10160A/AVS-6 tube will perform similarly to a GEN III VII MX-10160A/AVS-6 tube, even though the former was manufactured in ~1992 and the latter ~2005.

One particular technology, PINNACLE©, is often mentioned as well. It is a proprietary thin-film microchannel plate technology created by ITT (since combined with Exelis, acquired by Harris, then sold to Elbit Systems of America) that was included in the OMNI VII contract. The thin-film improves performance.

That being said, GEN III OMNI V–IX devices developed in the 2000s and onward can differ from standard GEN III and earlier GEN III OMNI I-IV devices in one or both of two important ways:

 An automatic gated power supply system regulates the photocathode voltage, allowing the NVD to instantaneously adapt to changing light conditions.
 A removed or greatly thinned ion barrier (thin film) which decreases the number of electrons that are usually rejected by the standard GEN III MCP, hence resulting in less image noise.  The disadvantage to a thin or removed ion barrier is the overall decrease in tube life from a theoretical  mean time to failure (MTTF) for standard Gen III type, to  MTTF for thin film types. However, this is largely negated by the low number of image-intensifier tubes that reach  of operation before requiring replacement.

While the consumer market sometimes classifies this type of system as generation 4, the United States military describes these systems as generation 3 autogated tubes (GEN III OMNI V-IX). Moreover, as autogating power supplies can now be added to any previous generation of night-vision devices, "autogating" capability does not automatically class the devices as belonging to a particular OMNI classification. Any postnominals appearing after a generation type (i.e., Gen II+, Gen III+) do not change the generation type of the device, but instead indicate improvement(s) over the original specification's requirements.

Examples:
 AN/PVS-22
 NVS-22
 Binocular Night Vision Device (BNVD) (AN/PVS-15, AN/PVS-21, AN/PVS-23, AN/PVS-31A, AN/PVS-31D)
 Ground Panoramic Night Vision Goggle (GPNVG-18)

Figure of merit
Figure of merit (FoM) is a number which gives a quantitative measure of a night vision device's effectiveness and clarity. It is calculated using the number of line pairs per millimeter which a user can detect while using the device multiplied by the image intensifier's signal-to-noise ratio.

In the late 1990s, innovations in photocathode technology significantly increased the signal-to-noise ratio, with newly developed tubes starting to surpass the performance of standard Gen 3 tubes.

By 2001, the United States federal government concluded that a tube's "generation" was not a determinant factor of a tube's global performance, making the term "generation" irrelevant in determining the performance of an image-intensifier tube, and therefore eliminated the term as a basis of export regulations.

Though image-intensification technology employed by different manufacturers varies, from the tactical point of view, a night-vision system is an optical device that enables vision in conditions of low light. The US government itself has recognized the fact that the technology itself makes little difference, as long as an operator can see clearly at night. Consequently, the United States bases export regulations not on the generation, but on the figure of merit.

ITAR regulations specify that US-made tubes with a FOM greater than 1400 are not exportable outside the US; however, the Defense Technology Security Administration (DTSA) can waive that policy on a case-by-case basis.

Fusion night vision 

Fusion night vision is a newer advance in night vision technology which combines I² (image intensification) with thermal imaging, which functions in the medium (MWIR 3-5 µm) and/or long (LWIR 8-14 µm) wavelength range. Initial models appeared in the 2000s and progressed in the 2010s. Some devices are dedicated fusion devices while others are clip-on thermal imagers which can add a thermal overlay to standard I² night vision devices. Fusion technologies combines the strengths of traditional I², which is excellent for navigation and discernment of fine details, with the strengths of thermal imaging, which excels in spotting the heat signatures of targets. Fusion systems have offered a number of different imaging modes including "fused" night vision with thermal overlay, night vision only, thermal only, and various special fusion modes like outline (which outlines objects that have thermal signatures) or "decamouflage", which highlights all objects that are of near-human temperatures. Fusion devices do struggle with weight and power usage and are often heavier and have shorter run times than contemporary I²-only devices.

Aside from fusion of I² and thermal imaging within a single device, some users have tried using an I² device over one eye and a thermal device over the other eye, relying on the human visual system to provide a binocular combined view of the two. Some, but not all, thermal imaging systems can also be viewed through a night vision device (ie. lining up the thermal imager in front of the I² night vision device) to produce a form of fusion vision.

Examples:
 AN/PSQ-20 ENVG (Enhanced Night Vision Goggles)
 AN/PSQ-36 FGE (Fusion Goggle Enhanced, previously FGS for Fusion Goggle System)
 AN/PSQ-42 ENVG-B (Enhanced Night Vision Goggles-Binocular)
 AN/PSQ-44 ENVG-B (Enhanced Night Vision Goggles-Binocular)
 AN/PAS-29 COTI/E-COTI: (Enhanced) Clip-On Thermal Imager

Out of Band (OOB) 
Out of Band (OOB) refers to night vision technologies which operate outside of the 500-900 nm NIR (near infrared) range that traditional Gen III gallium arsenide tubes detect. Imaging outside the usual spectrum is possible with dedicated OOB image intensifier tubes or with clip-on devices. Two examples include Photonis' 4G HyMa (Hybrid Multi-Alkali) image intensifier tubes (bandwidth of 350-1100 nm, from near UV to IR) and Safran Optics 1's AN/PAS-34 E-COSI (Enhanced Clip-On SWIR Imager), which clips onto standard night vision devices and provides an overlay (in the 900-1700 nm range), respectively. 

OOB provides several advantages. First, OOB imaging makes better use of ambient light; while a standard Gen III/III+ device can only intensify light in the 500-900 nm NIR range, an OOB device also intensifies any UV light or SWIR light in the environment. As a result, an OOB device might be able to see more on a starlit night than a standard GEN III/III+ device could. Second, OOB imaging can help JTACs and other FACs when marking targets with a laser designator. Many laser designators use 1064nm light, which is barely visible to standard Gen III/III+ devices, so ground personnel may need to use a separate "see-spot" device to visually confirm that the designator's targeting laser is on target. OOB night vision devices, however, can easily image the 1064nm range. 

Third, OOB light is not visible to most commercially available night vision devices. Despite ITAR restrictions, night vision technologies have proliferated among peer and near-peer countries and have also made their way into terrorist hands. For example, there has been documented use of night vision equipment by the Taliban Red Unit. As a result, if friendly forces are using night vision equipment like IR illuminators, IR strobes, IR lasers, etc. then hostile forces using night vision equipment could spot them as well. OOB strobes, illuminators, and lasers, on the other hand, are easily visible when using OOB night vision but much more difficult to spot with current Gen III/III+ night vision equipment as they appear faintly if at all (depending on wavelength and intensity).

Additionally, depending on the wavelengths covered by an OOB imaging device, users might be able to observe the lasers used in laser rangefinders as they often operate in the 1550nm range.

Examples (ground personnel, helmet-mounted imagers):
Photonis 4G INTENS image intensifier tubes (350-1100 nm)
Optics 1 AN/PAS-34 E-COSI (Enhanced Clip-On SWIR Imager) (900-1700 nm)
Optics 1 COSMO (Clip-On SWIR Monocular)

Examples (ground personnel, weapon-mounted lasers):
B.E. Meyers & Co. MAWL-CLAD (Modular Aiming Weapon Laser--Covert Laser Aiming Device) (1064 nm laser)
LA-17/PEQ D-PILS (Dual-band Pointer and Illuminator Laser System)  (1400-1600 nm)
Rheinmetall LM-VAMPIR (Laser Module--VAriable Multi Purpose InfraRed)

AN/PSQ-23 STORM, STORM-PI, STORM-SLX, STORM II; and L3Harris SPEAR (1570 nm)
Optics 1 ICUGR (Integrated Compact Ultralight Gun-mounted Rangefinder) (1550 nm)
Rheinmetall FCS-RPAL (Fire Control System--Rheinmetall Precision Aiming Laser) (1550 nm)
Rheinmetall FCS-TRB (Fire Control System--TacRay Ballistic) (1550 nm)
Wilcox RAPTAR S (Rapid Targeting and Ranging Module) (1550 nm)
Wilcox MRF Xe (Micro Range Finder--Enhanced) (1550 nm)

B.E. Meyers & Co. IZLID Ultra 1064 and 1550 (Infrared Zoom Laser Illuminator Designator) (1064 nm, 1550 nm)
Optics 1 CTAM (Coded Target Acquisition Marker) (1064 nm)

Wide Field of View (WFoV) 

Night vision devices, whether monocular or binocular, typically have a limited field of view (FoV); the commonly used AN/PVS-14 has a FoV of 40° which is rather less than the 95° monocular horizontal FoV and 190° binocular horizontal FoV that humans possess. Due to the limited FoV, users must visually scan about to fully check their surroundings, which is a time consuming process. This limitation is particularly evident when using night vision devices for flying, driving, or CQB where split second decisions must be made. Because of these limitations, many SOF troops preferred to use white light rather than night vision when conducting CQB. As a result, much time and effort has gone into research to develop a wider FoV solution for night vision devices. As of 2021, there were three primary methods for increasing peripheral vision in night vision devices (each with their own advantages and disadvantages):
Panoramic night vision goggles (PNVG)
Foveated night vision goggles (F-NVG)
Diverging image tube night vision goggles (DIT-NVG)

Panoramic night vision goggles (PNVG) increase field of view by increasing the number of sensors: if tubes are generally limited to 40°, then one can add more tubes to increase peripheral vision. This solution works well and does not compromise device performance or visual clarity but comes at the cost of size, weight, power requirements, and complexity. A well-known set of peripheral NVGs is the GPNVG-18 (Ground Peripheral Night Vision Goggle), which was used in the raid in Abottabad that killed Osama Bin Laden. These goggles, and the aviation AN/AVS-10 PNVG from which they were derived, offer a 97° FoV.

Foveated night vision (F-NVG) uses specialized WFoV optics to increase the field of view through a night vision intensifier tube. The fovea refers to the part of the retina which is responsible for central vision. These night vision devices have users still look "straight through" the tubes so light passing through the center of the tube falls on the foveal retina, as is the case with traditional binocular NVGs. While these devices increase FoV, it comes at the price of image quality and edge distortions. A US Naval contract for US$47.6 million was awarded to Kent Optronics to retrofit AN/PVS-15 units with WFoV optics that expanded them to 80° FoV with less than 4% distortion.

Diverging image tube (DIT) night vision increases FoV by positioning the night vision tubes so they are no longer parallel but are angled slightly outward. This increases peripheral FoV but causes distortion and reduced image quality. Unfortunately, optical clarity is best when looking through the center of an image intensifier tube. With DIT, users are no longer looking "straight through" the center of the tubes (which provides the clearest images) and light passing through the center of the tubes no longer falls on the fovea (the area of clearest vision). The AN/PVS-25 was one such example of DIT night vision from the late 2000s. The WFoV BNVD is a variant of the AN/PVS-31A which incorporates both F-NVG and DIT-NVG concepts: the foveal WFoV optics increase the FoV of each tube from 40° to 55°, while the slight angulation of the tubes positions them so there is a 40° overlap of binocular vision in the center and a total 70° bi-ocular FoV. With the performance of the modified AN/PVS-31A tubes used, the WFoV BNVD has a FoM of 2706 which is better than the FoM in both the GPNVG-18 and the standard AN/PVS-31A.

Examples:
Panoramic NVG (PNVG):
GPNVG-18
AN/AVS-10 (PNVG)

Foveated NVG (F-NVG):
WFoV F-NVG retrofit AN/PVS-15 goggles
WFoV BNVD (combined F-NVG and DIT-NVG variant of AN/PVS-31A)

Diverging Image Tube NVG (DIT-NVG)
AN/PVS-25
WFoV BNVD (combined F-NVG and DIT-NVG variant of AN/PVS-31A)
Noise Fighters Panobridge: binocular bridge mount which combines two AN/PVS-14 monoculars and allows them to be angulated outward or positioned parallel for DIT or traditional configuration

Digital
Some night vision devices, including several of the ENVG (AN/PSQ-20) models, are "digital". Introduced in the late 2000s, these allow electronic transmission of the device's night vision view, though this often comes at the price of size, weight, power usage.

Advancements in high-sensitivity digital camera technology has made it possible to produce NVGs that use a camera-display pair instead of an image intensifier. At the low end of the market, these devices can offer Gen-1-equivalent quality at a lower cost. At the higher end, SiOnyx has produced digital color NVGs. The "Opsin" of 2022 has a form factor and helmet weight similar to that of a AN/PVS-14, but requires a separate battery pack with a shorter battery life and remains inferior in sensitivity. Being a camera-based design, it can however tolerate bright light and process a wider range of wavelengths.

Other technologies 
Ceramic Optical Ruggedized Engine (CORE) is a technology which was first shown at the 2012 SHOT Show in Las Vegas, NV by Armasight. CORE produces a higher-performance Gen 1 tubes. The main difference between CORE tubes and standard Gen 1 tubes is introduction of a ceramic plate instead of a glass one. This plate is produced from specially formulated ceramic and metal alloys.  Edge distortion is improved, photo sensitivity is increased, and the resolution can be as high as 60 /mm.  CORE is still considered Gen 1, as it does not utilize a microchannel plate.

Scientists at the University of Michigan have developed a contact lens that can act as a night-vision device.  The lens has a thin strip of graphene between layers of glass that reacts to photons to make dark images look brighter.  Current prototypes only absorb 2.3% of light, so the percentage of light pickup has to rise before the lens can be viable.  The graphene technology can be expanded into other uses, like car windshields, to improve night-driving.  The US. Army is interested in the technology to potentially replace night-vision goggles.

The Sensor and Electron Devices Directorate (SEDD) of the US Army Research Laboratory developed quantum-well infrared detector (QWID) technology. This technology's epitaxial layers, which result in diode formation, compose a gallium arsenide or aluminum gallium arsenide system (GaAs or AlGaAs). It is particularly sensitive to infrared waves that are mid-long lengths. The Corrugated QWIP (CQWIP) broadens detection capacity by using a resonance superstructure to orient more of the electric field parallel, so that it can be absorbed. Although cryogenic cooling between 77 K and 85 K is required, QWID technology is considered for constant surveillance viewing due to its claimed low cost and uniformity in materials.

Materials from the II–VI compounds, such as HgCdTe, are used for high-performing infrared light-sensing cameras. In 2017 the US Army Research Labs in collaboration with Stony Brook University developed an alternative within the III–V family of compounds. InAsSb, a III–V compound, is commonly used commercially for opto-electronics in items such as DVDs and cell phones.   To counteract this possibility in implementing InAsSb, scientists added a graded layer with increased atomic spacing and an intermediate layer of the substrate GaAs to trap any potential defects. This technology was designed with night-time military operations in mind.

Soviet Union and Russia

The Soviet Union, and after 1991 the Russian Federation, have developed a range of night-vision devices. Models used after 1960 by the Russian/Soviet Army are designated 1PNxx (xx), where 1PN is the GRAU index of night-vision devices. The PN stands for pritsel nochnoy, meaning "night sight", and the xx is the model number. Different models introduced around the same time use the same type of batteries and mechanism for mounting on the weapon. The multi-weapon models have replaceable elevation scales, with one scale for the ballistic arc of each supported weapon. The weapons supported include the AK family, sniper rifles, light machine guns and hand-held grenade launchers.

 1PN34 refractor-based night sight for a range of small arms and grenade launchers, see photo.
 1PN50 refractor-based night observation binoculars.
 1PN51 reflector-based night sight for a range of small arms and grenade launchers.
 1PN51-2 reflector-based night sight for the RPG-29.
 1PN58 refractor-based night sight for a range of small arms and grenade launchers.
 1PN93-2 reflector-based night sight for the RPG-7D3, see photo.
 1PN110, a more recent (~Gen 3) night sight for the RPG-29.
 1PN113, a night sight similar to the 1PN110, for the SV-98 sniper rifle.

The Russian army has also contracted the development of and fielded a series of so-called . The counter-sniper night sight is an active system that uses laser pulses from a laser diode to detect reflections from the focal elements of enemy optical systems and estimate their range. The vendor claims that this system is unparalleled:
 1PN106 counter-sniper night sight for the SVD sniper rifle and its SVDS variant.
 1PN119 counter-sniper night sight for the PKMN and Pecheneg light machine guns.
 1PN120 counter-sniper night sight for the SVDK sniper rifle.
 1PN121 counter-sniper night sight for the ASVK large caliber sniper rifle.
 1PN123 counter-sniper night sight for the SV-98 sniper rifle.

Legality
 Belgium: firearms legislation forbids any night-vision device if it can be mounted on a firearm; even if not mounted, they are considered illegal.
 Czech Republic: not regulated. Previously only available for hunting. 
 Germany: law forbids such devices if their purpose is to be mounted on firearms. Due to the African swine fever virus exceptions for hunting wild boars were made around 2021.
 Iceland: the use of night-vision devices for hunting is prohibited, while there are no restrictions on the devices themselves.
 India: civilian possession and trading of night-vision scopes is illegal. Permission is  needed from Union home ministry for possession.
 Netherlands: the possession of night-vision devices is not regulated, night-vision devices mounted on firearms are forbidden unless a permit is granted. The usage of night-vision equipment for night-time hunting (weapon mounted) is allowed only with a special permit in certain areas (the Veluwe) for hunting wild boar.
 New Zealand: rescue helicopter services use several sets of 3rd-generation night-vision goggles imported from the US, and the country is required to restrict access to the equipment to comply with the strict regulations regarding their export. There are no prohibitions on the ownership or use of night-vision equipment for shooting non-indigenous game animals, such as rabbits, hares, deer, pigs, tahr, chamois, goats, wallabies, etc.
 United States: a 2010–2011 summary of state hunting regulations for the use of night-vision equipment in hunting listed 13 states in which the equipment is prohibited, 17 states with various restrictions (e.g. only for certain non-game species, and/or in a certain date range), and 20 states without restrictions. It did not summarize the regulations for thermal-imaging equipment.
 California: it is a misdemeanor to possess a device "designed for or adaptable to use on a firearm which, through the use of a projected infrared light source and electronic telescope, enables the operator thereof to visually determine and locate the presence of objects during the night-time".  This essentially covers scopes using Gen0 technology, but not the subsequent generations.  There was an effort in 1995 to further expand restrictions to forbid night-vision devices that did not incorporate a light source, but it did not become law.
 Minnesota, as of 2014, "A person may not possess night vision or thermal imaging equipment while taking wild animals or while having in possession [an uncased and loaded weapon] that could be used to take wild animals." There is an exception for law-enforcement and military use. The night-vision prohibition was enacted in 2007, and the thermal-imaging prohibition was added in 2014. Two bills were introduced in the Minnesota Legislature in 2016, proposing to allow night-vision and thermal-imaging equipment for, respectively, 1) "predator" or 2) "unprotected wild animal" hunting.

See also

References

External links

 TNVC guide to night vision generations and specifications Archived on 19 July 2021
 Nitewalker guide to night vision equipment Archived on 15 August 2021
 Night Vision Devices Modeling and Optimal Design Archived  on 6 May 2022

US patents 
 
 
 
 
 
 

Armoured fighting vehicle vision and sighting equipment
Military electronics
Military sensor technology